Johannes Kahrs may refer to:

 Johannes Kahrs (artist) (born 1965), German artist
 Johannes Kahrs (politician) (born 1963), German politician